Řetová is a municipality and village in Ústí nad Orlicí District in the Pardubice Region of the Czech Republic. It has about 700 inhabitants.

History
The first written mention of Řetová is from 1292, when it was owned by the newly established Zbraslav Monastery.

References

Villages in Ústí nad Orlicí District